Shah Ismail Dehlvi (26 April, 1779 – 6 May, 1831) was an Indian Islamic scholar and Salafi-oriented Sufi reformer. He was an active member in the jihad proclaimed by Sayyid Ahmad of Raebareilly with the support of Pashtun tribes against the Sikh Empire, which ruled northwest India with their base in Punjab in the early half of the 19th century. He is considered as an important influence on the Ahl-i Hadith and Deobandi reform movements.

Early life and career
Isma'il Dehlvi was born on 26 April 1779. He was the grandson of famous Islamic scholar and leader Shah Waliullah Dehlawi, through his son Shah Abdul Ghani. When a new Islamic religious revivalist movement appeared in northern India under the leadership of Sayyid Ahmad of Raebareilly (1786 – 1831), he was joined by two members of the Shah Waliullah family: Shah Ismail Dehlavi (1771-1831) and Maulvi Abdul Hai (died 1828) who joined it because they shared its mission and objectives. "The agenda of the new movement known as Tariqah-i-Muhammadiyah was to purify the tenets of Islam from Hindu customs, traditions and cultural practices." "His motive was to convince the Muslim community to purify Islam from Hindu influences and Shiite rituals. He was harsh in his criticism and believed that religion should be practiced in its original form; a thought process which gradually evolved into a Jihad movement." Professor of history at the University of California; Barbara D. Metcalf writes:

According to  Andreas Rieck, Syed Ahmad visited towns of North Indian plains from 1818 to 1821 with hundreds of missionaries to preach against Shia beliefs and practices. Syed Ahmad repeatedly destroyed ta'ziyas, an act that resulted in subsequent riots and chaos. Barbara Metcalf offers the following explanation to his anti-shi'ism:

In 1821, Shah Ismail left for Hajj (pilgrimage) along with Syed Ahmad and a group of his devotees. He returned from Haj in 1823, and once again visited different parts of India. For Syed Ahmad and the followers of the Faraizi movement, India was “Darul Harb” (the abode of war) and therefore jihad was obligatory for the Muslims. In his book, Sirat-e-Mustaqeem, Shah Ismail Dehlavi wrote:

"a large part of present-day India has become “Dar-ul-Harab”. Compare the situation with the heavenly blessings of India two and three hundred years ago".

Comparing India with Darul Islam, he said:

"compare India with Rome and Turkey in terms of heavenly blessings".

Establishment of Islamic State

Shah Ismail broke with the popular Indian Hanafi tradition, but subsequently became convinced that he could not set up his ideal society so long as the company rule held sway over the subcontinent. Shah Ismail joined the cause of Sayyid Ahmad, who had moved to the Pashtun areas bordering Afghanistan (today’s Khyber Pakhtunkhwa) with his followers to lead an armed Jihad against the British. Sayyid Ahmad established a mujahideen state and proclaimed himself as the Amir ul-Mu'minin (Commander of the Faithful). The main objective of the Jihad movement led by Sayyid Ahmad was to establish an Islamic state that rules over the subcontinent. At that time, much of North India was  ruled by the British. So the leadership of the jihad movement concluded that they should move to an area with less control of the British and with large majority of Muslim population - North-West Frontier region - which is now known as Khyber Pakhtunkhwa in Pakistan. The Frontier region was chosen to carry out this experimentation, based on the assumption that being devout Muslims, the Pashtuns would support the reformist movement.

The opponents of the mujahideen of Sayyid Ahmad and Shah Ismail labelled them as "Wahhabis", associating them with the Muwahhideen reformers who had risen to prominence in the Arabia. Their followers, however, preferred the term Tariqah-yi Muhammadi (way of Muhammad) to describe themselves. The Tariqah-yi-Muhammadi movement coupled their emphasis on the direct consultation of Scriptural texts with an aggressive campaign against shirk (polytheism) and bidat (heretical innovations), attacking practices they asserted that Indian Muslims had adopted from Hindus or Shias. While the rest of the Indian clergy had commonly differentiated between bidat-i-hasanah and bidat-i-sayyia (good and bad innovations), the Tariqah-i Muhammadiyya criticised all forms of bidat, insisting that the Prophet’s own life and practices were the best guide for Muslims.

Following the teachings of the Mujahidin commander Sayyid Ahmad, Shah Ismail Dehlvi advocated the purging of numerous practices and rituals such as istigatha (asking needs) to the dead, wearing tawiz (amulets), making vows, etc.; which he condemned as shirk (polytheism). Equating these practices to idol worship of Hindus and excommunicating those who practised them, Shah Ismail declared in his treatise Taqwiyat al-Iman:"It is customary for many people, in the time of difficulty, to invoke the spirits of pir, apostles, imams, martyrs and angels, and fairies, and to beg them to fulfil their wishes. To propitiate them, vows and of erings are made in the ir names. Moreover, childrcn arc named after them, for instance, 'Abdun Nabi (slave of apostle), Ali Bakhsh(gift of Ali); as well as Hasan Bakhsh, Husayn Bakhsh, Madar Bakhsh, Salar Bakhsh, and also Ghulam Muhiy-u-Din (slave of the reviver of the Faith). And for the life protection of their children some keep a lock of hair on their heads, and others make them wear a woven thread around their necks and clothe them in the name of some saints. Some people put chains on the leg of their children, and some offer sacrifices. Many of them invoke the saints in the time of difficulty and take oaths in their names. In short, what the Hindus do towards their idols, these pseudo Muslims do all these things with prophets, saints, imams, martyrs, angels and fairies, and yet they claim that they themselves are Musalmans.When the military actions were initiated, some Muslim nawabs, like Amir Khan of Tonk, provided funds but did not join them for jihad. Around 8,000 mujahideen who accompanied them were mostly clergymen or poor people who joined the militia. The rulers of Tonk, Gwalior and Rampur supported him with British consent because they were dependent on British forces and they knew well enough that the British would not stop them from aiding an enemy of the Sikhs. Since Syed Ahmad’s campaign was based on Islamic concept of jihad, his spokesman, Shah Ismail Dehlavi, tries to create desire for the war by saying:

"as far as the special benefits are concerned that go to the faithful Martyrs, the Muslim Mujahideen, the ruling Sultans and the brave men of the battle field, don’t need to be elaborated here".

Arriving in Peshawar valley in late 1826, Sayyid Ahmad and his followers made their base in the towns of Hund and Zaida in Swabi District. Dehlavi and Syed Ahmad preached jihad amongst the local Pashtun tribes, demanding they renounce their tribal customs and adopt the shariah. The traditional khans were replaced by the ulema (Islamic clerics) and a system of Islamic taxes was established to finance the jihad campaign. Soon after this missionary campaign and the establishment of the shari'a system, jihad was declared. He sent a message to Ranjit Singh to

"either become a Muslim, pay Jizyah or fight and remember that in case of war, Yaghistan supports the Indians".

The mujahideen received both ideological preaching and physical training sessions. Syed Ahmad and Ismail Dehlavi organized wrestling, archery training and shooting competitions. The mujahideen also sang anthems. One such anthems has survived, known as Risala Jihad, it goes as follows:

"War against the Infidel is incumbent on all Musalmans;

make provisions for all things.

He who from his heart gives one farthing to the cause,

shall hereafter receive seven hundred fold from God.

He who shall equip a warrior in this cause of God,

shall hereafter obtain a martyr's reward;

His children dread not the trouble of the grave,

nor the last trump, not the Day of Judgement.

Cease to be crowds; join the divine leader, and smite the Infidel.

I give thanks to God that a great leader has been born,

in the thirteenth of the Hijra".

In December 1826 they clashed with Sikh troops at Akora with some success. On 11 January 1827, allegiance was sworn on his hand and Syed Ahmad was declared caliph and imam. Syed Ahmad’s claim of leadership was viewed with suspicion in the Frontier region as well as in the clerical circles of North India. When the Friday sermon was read in his name, it became clear to the tribal chiefs that he wanted the political power for himself. According to Khadi Khan, a Pashtun sardar:

"it is the job of the Sardars to take care of the people, not a Maulvi who spends his life on donations. Maulvies are ill-equipped to run the affairs of a State".

Syed Ahmad tried to explain that his aim was not this-worldly but to lead jihad against the infidels. In one of his letters, he writes:

"We thank and praise God, the real master and the true king, who bestowed upon his humble, recluse and helpless servant the title of Caliphate, first through occult gestures and revelations, in which there is no room for doubt, and then by guiding the hearts of the believers towards me. This way God appointed me as the Imam (leader)".

Criticizing the opponents, Shah Ismail Dehlavi wrote:

"therefore, obedience to Syed Ahmad is obligatory on all Muslims. Whoever does not accept the leadership of His Excellency or rejects it after accepting it, is an apostate and mischievous, and killing him is part of the jihad as is the killing of the disbelievers. Therefore, the appropriate response to opponents is that of the sword and not the pen".

Regarding his Imamate, Syed Ahmad wrote to Nawab Wazir ud-Dawla, the ruler of Tonk:

"believe me, the person who sincerely confesses to my position is special in the eyes of God, and the one who denies it is, of course sinful. My opponents who deny me of this position will be humiliated and disgraced".

Mubarak Ali writes:

In addition to the stated social agenda, Sayyid Ahmad also attempted to collect the Islamic tithe (usher) of ten per cent of crop yields. The alliance was defeated and the Islamic reformers finally occupied Peshawar. Over several months during 1830, Sayyed Ahmad tried to conciliate established power hierarchies. But before the end of 1830; an organized uprising occurred and the agents of Sayyid Ahmad in Peshawar and in the villages of the plain were murdered and the movement retreated to hills.

They ran into trouble in this area with many of these Pashtun tribes because they had no cultural or linguistic relation to the locals and tried to wipe out their own old tribal rules and customs by force. Some of their old tribal leaders had sensed a threat to their own prevailing influence over the local tribal population and their traditional Pakhtun nationalism which they were not willing to give up and hand their power and influence over to the newcomers in their area in the name of Islam.

Punjab, parts of North-West Frontier and Kashmir regions, in 1831, were under the strict rule of powerful Maharaja Ranjit Singh who also had future ambitions to control all of the North-West Frontier region of the Pashtuns. So he sent his powerful Sikh army to fight them and after a fierce battle, defeated them, at Balakot. There in the town of Balakot in 1831, Syed Ahmad was killed by the Sikh Army. He was beheaded.

Death and legacy 
Ismail Dehlvi was killed on 6 May 1831 during a fierce battle at Balakot against the army of Maharaja Ranjit Singh (1780 – 1839), the ruler of the Sikh empire that governed the region at that time. "Traditional historians accused the Pakhtun tribes of betraying the religious cause and glorified the role of the movement." Some other historians point out that the British government silently supported the movement and its planned migration to the North-West Frontier region. "Most probably, the British government wanted to shift the troublesome elements from the territory under their control to that of the Sikhs' in order to weaken the Sikh rule."

The historical roots of Ahl-i Hadith, the puritanical reform movement that emerged in mid 19th-century India, is traced back to the Jihad movement of Shah Ismail. Shah Ismail's doctrines on Tawhid (monotheism) and fervent condemnations of various practices he regarded as shirk (polytheism), denunciations of celebrations like Mawlid as bid'ah (religious innovation); along with his emphasis on the requirement to directly return to scriptural sources without imitating a madhab (legal school) would deeply influence the Ahl-i Hadith. Although the Islamic state of the Mujahidin was later destroyed by the Sikh Empire, Shah's followers continued to spread his teachings travelling across the Indian subcontinent; and described themselves as Ahl-i Hadith. This set the stage for the emergence of an organised form of Salafism in the subcontinent. By the early 20th century, Ahl-i Hadith had become an important religious movement all across South Asia. Major scholars and religious students of the Deobandi movement also refer to Shah Ismail's treatises for theological guidance.

On the other hand, the Barelvi movement claim Ismail Dehlvi broke the unity of Indian Muslims with the claim that God can lie, something they consider blasphemous. Fazl-e-Haq Khairabadi was one of the early scholars to refute Ismail Dehlvi before Ahmed Raza Khan Barelvi a few decade later.

Literary works
 Taqwiyat-ul-Iman (Strengthening of the Faith), (an online book translated in English from the original book written by Dehlvi)
 Sirat-al-Mustaqeem (Right Path)

Gallery

References

External links
 Syed Ahmed Barelvi and his Jihad movement
 eBook in Urdu language on Shah Ismail Shaheed with introduction by Abu Ala Maududi, Published 1 October 1943 by Qaumi Kutub Khana, Lahore
 Taqwiyat-ul-Iman (Strengthening of the Faith) an eBook translated in English and originally written by Shah Ismail Dehlvi on islamhouse.com website

Muslim reformers
1779 births
1831 deaths
Proto-Salafists
19th-century Indian Muslims
19th-century Muslim scholars of Islam
Anti-Shi'ism
Critics of Shia Islam
Indian Sunni Muslim scholars of Islam
Indian Islamists
Sufi writers